Virupa (Tib. bi ru pa or bir wa pa,), also known as Virupaksa and Tutop Wangchuk, was an 8th-9th century Indian mahasiddha and yogi, and the source of important cycles of teachings in Tibetan Buddhism.

The Source of Virupa or Birubapa 

He is especially known as the source of the Lamdré ("path-fruit", Skt. mārga-phala) system held by the Sakya school and is thus seen as the Indian founder of their lineage. A series of verses called the Vajra verses, which are pith instructions on the Hevajra tantra, are also attributed to him.

Tibetan sources mention that he was born in Tripura in East India and studied at the Somapura Mahavihara as a monk and practiced tantra, particularly Cakrasamvara.
Alternatively, Indian sources such as the Navanathacaritramu detail that he was born in Maharashtra around the Konkan region to a pious Brahmin couple. The Tibetan historian Taranatha also says that he lived in Maharashtra.

Tibetan sources further state that after years of tantric practice with no results, he gave up tantra and threw his mala in the toilet. Then he received a vision from the deity Nairatmya who became his main deity and he subsequently received teachings and empowerments from her. He eventually left the monastery and traveled throughout India teaching tantra, performing various magical feats (siddhis) as well as "converting non-Buddhists (tirthikas), destroying their images and stopping their sanguinary rituals."

According to Indologist James Mallinson, a text called the Amṛtasiddhi, which is the earliest confirmed text to teach Hatha yoga techniques, is attributed to Virupa. He also appears as a mahasiddha in various non-Buddhist texts, especially Nath works.

'Virupa' or 'Birupa' as a preaching Guru 
The Buddhist monk, Virubapa, contributed the 3rd poem of the list found in the Charyapada manuscript. It is documented that he flourished at the reigning period of Devpala ranging from 810-850 A.D. Virubapa was supposed to have been born at the thriving period of Devpala, the third king of the Pala dynasty. Devpala had succeeded to exert influence in Bangla, the adjacent areas of his kingdom,Tripura. This made the monk like Virubapa have a close contact with the Sompura Mohavira at Paharpur, Bogura in Bangladesh. Thus; his contact with the lower caste of Hindu people like ‘Surini’, a lady who lives by making and selling wines (p.13) has been validated the poem reiterates-

“There is one female wine-seller. She enters into two houses. She ferments wine with fine barks (of trees)” (L. 1-2; p.35).

The translation of the source poem into English goes like-

The lady of winery produces drunk’s nectar craftily,

And glides herself into the duo-caves gaily.

Ay craftswoman, thou be stable in thy action,

That will harken thou deathless with a physique so strong.

You left a mark on the display door for your sale,

The wine seekers hurried gaily to the door without fail.  

The variegated cups were full to the brim to seep,

And the wine chasers relished them to dip down the deep.

The wind laden cup reaches to a lean vain like door,

That Biruwa bewares you to care whence the wine to pour.

These Buddhist Tantric who revealed the practices of “SAHAJYANA” through the songs on various ragas had few things identical:- a. They all accepted the “SAHAJYANA”, the reformed form of ‘MAHAYANA Buddhism’, b. they chose songs as the form of preaching the theology, c. They used the human body as the great metaphor of communion with desire and void, and d. They used a few of the specified ragas. These alignments of poetic theme and structures reveals the truth that they had somehow close association with each other- historically, geographically, thematically, spiritually as their way of ‘Bodhi Marg”(attaining knowledge) had to follow a flexible way of seeking for ‘GURU’, ‘Siddhacharya’, or the guide to be followed by the disciples. Perhaps; this ideation enabled a songwriter to have a connection with generations of followings and leading.   

Dr. Muhammad Sahidullah also reported that Virubapa had for some time visited Paharpur Mohavira and stayed there to preach the theory of ‘SAHAJYANA’ and Paharpur Mohavira had a reputation for the abode and teaching place for the Buddhist Monks at the time of the PALA dynasty. This monastery was situated in the Northwestern region of Bangladesh that kept close contact with the Tibetan Buddhist monks. Virubapa had a disciple, Dombipa, who is also the writer of the song no. 14 and thus the Buddhist cult of SAHAZYANA community extends through GURU-DISCIPLE co-relational practices.

See also
 Tilopa
 Naropa
 Mahasiddha
 Sakya

References

Bibliography
Tseten, Lama Migmar, The Play of Mahamudra: Spontaneous Teachings on Virupa's Mystical Songs, Wisdom Publications, 2021

8th-century Buddhists
Bodhisattvas
Indian scholars of Buddhism
History of Tibet
Buddhist missionaries
Indian Buddhist missionaries
Sakya lamas
Mahasiddhas
Indian Buddhist monks
Buddhist yogis
8th-century Indian philosophers
8th-century Indian monks
8th-century Buddhist monks